Joseph Maraite (11 September 1949 – 25 April 2021) was a Belgian politician of the German-speaking Community.

Biography
A member of the Christlich Soziale Partei, Maraite became a member of the Council of the German-speaking Community in 1977. In 1986, he succeeded  as Minister-President of the German-speaking Community. He served until he was replaced by Karl-Heinz Lambertz in 1999. From 2004 to 2017, he served as Mayor of Burg-Reuland.

Joseph Maraite died in St. Vith on 25 April 2021 at the age of 71.

References

1949 births
2021 deaths
People from Waimes
Ministers-President of the German-speaking Community in Belgium
Christlich Soziale Partei (Belgium) politicians
Mayors of places in Belgium